Always and Forever is the fifth studio album by Alien Ant Farm. The album features two singles: "Let 'Em Know", which was released on May 1, 2013, and "Homage", which was released on September 2, 2014. The latter received radio airplay on September 23, 2014.

Track listing

References

Alien Ant Farm albums
2006 albums
Albums produced by Johnny K